Mycinamicin III 3''-O-methyltransferase (MycF) is an enzyme with systematic name S-adenosyl-L-methionine:mycinamicin III 3''-O-methyltransferase. This enzyme catalyses the following chemical reaction

 S-adenosyl-L-methionine + mycinamicin III  S-adenosyl-L-homocysteine + mycinamicin IV

The enzyme is involved in the biosynthesis of mycinamicin macrolide antibiotics.

References

External links 
 

EC 2.1.1